Sevdalin Marinov (born 11 June 1968) is a former Bulgarian weightlifter. He became Olympic Champion in 1988 in the Flyweight class.

Sevdalin competed many times internationally and went on to win many Olympic and commonwealth medals. Marinov became one of the three youngest Bulgarian Olympic champions in weightlifting (20 years, 3 months and 7 days). He is a three-time World (1985 in Södertälje, Sweden, 1986 in Sofia, Bulgaria, and 1987 in Ostrava, Czech Republic) and a five-time European champion (1985 in Katowice, Poland, 1986 in Karl-Marx-Stadt, Germany, 1987 in Reims, France, 1988 in Cardiff, UK, and 1990 in Aalborg, Denmark). In the period between 1985 and 1988, he was literally unbeatable at major forums in the category of up to 52 kg. He has a total of 6 World and 9 Olympic records.

In 1979 Sevdalin Marinov started his training at the Vasil Levski Sports School and trained under the coach Dimitar Stoykov. He competed consecutively for the teams of Asenovets (from 1978 until 1983), Maritsa (from 1983 until 1987) and CSKA (from 1988 until 1991). In 1991 Marinov settled in Australia and after 1993 continued his career in the Green Continent. In 1994 he became a champion of the Commonwealth Games in the category of 64 kg.

References

External links

1968 births
Bulgarian male weightlifters
Weightlifters at the 1988 Summer Olympics
Olympic gold medalists for Bulgaria
People from Asenovgrad
Living people
Olympic medalists in weightlifting
Bulgarian emigrants to Australia
Commonwealth Games medallists in weightlifting
Commonwealth Games gold medallists for Australia
Commonwealth Games silver medallists for Australia
Weightlifters at the 1994 Commonwealth Games
Medalists at the 1988 Summer Olympics
European Weightlifting Championships medalists
World Weightlifting Championships medalists
Medallists at the 1994 Commonwealth Games